This is a record of Bolivia's results at the FIFA World Cup.
 
The FIFA World Cup is an international association football competition contested by the men's national teams of the members of Fédération Internationale de Football Association (FIFA), the sport's global governing body. The championship has been awarded every four years since the first tournament in 1930, except in 1942 and 1946, due to World War II.

The tournament consists of two parts, the qualification phase and the final phase (officially called the World Cup Finals). The qualification phase, which currently take place over the three years preceding the Finals, is used to determine which teams qualify for the Finals. The current format of the Finals involves 32 teams competing for the title, at venues within the host nation (or nations) over a period of about a month. The World Cup Finals is the most widely viewed sporting event in the world, with an estimated 715.1 million people watching the 2006 tournament final.

Bolivia have qualified for the Finals on three occasions, in 1930, 1950 and 1994. They have played in six matches at the Finals, but have lost five and drawn one, with their only goal coming against Spain in 1994.

Overall record

*Denotes draws including knockout matches decided via penalty shoot-out.

By match

Record by opponent

Record players

Eight players have been fielded in all of Bolivia's group matches in 1994, making them record World Cup players for their country. In the 1930 and 1950 editions, Bolivia was drawn into groups with less than four teams, allowing those years' squads to earn fewer caps.

Top goalscorers

The only Bolivian goal at a FIFA World Cup was scored by Erwin Sánchez during their 1–3 defeat against Spain in 1994. Bolivia had not scored in their previous five World Cup matches.

References

External links 
Profile at FIFA.com

 
Bolivia national football team records and statistics
Countries at the FIFA World Cup